Bouchercon is an annual convention of creators and devotees of mystery and detective fiction. It is named in honour of writer, reviewer, and editor Anthony Boucher; also the inspiration for the Anthony Awards, which have been issued at the convention since 1986. This page details Bouchercon XXVII and the 11th Anthony Awards ceremony.

Bouchercon
The convention was held in Saint Paul, Minnesota on October 10, 1996; running until the 13th. The event was chaired by Dennis Armstrong and freelance book reviewer Bruce Southworth. Armstrong was working for the local "Once Upon a Crime" book-store at the time and was allowed to take time off work to organise the event.

Special Guests
Guest of Honor — Mary Higgins Clark
Fan Guest of Honor — Ellen Nehr
Toastmaster — Jeremiah Healy

Anthony Awards
The following list details the awards distributed at the eleventh annual Anthony Awards ceremony.

Novel award
Winner:
Mary Willis Walker, Under the Beetle's Cellar

Shortlist:
Michael Connelly, The Last Coyote
Barbara D'Amato, Hard Christmas
Andrew Klavan, True Crime
Bill Pronzini, Blue Lonesome

First novel award
Winner:
Virginia Lanier, Death in Bloodhound Red

Shortlist:
Richard Barre, The Innocents
G. M. Ford, Who in Hell is Wanda Fuca?
Charles Kenney, Hammurabi's Code
Martha C. Lawrence, Murder in Scorpio

Paperback original award
Winners:
Harlan Coben, Deal Breaker

Shortlist:
Eileen Dreyer, Bad Medicine
Teri Holbrook, A Far and Deadly Cry
Gloria White, Charged with Guilt
Robert D. Zimmerman, Closet

Short story award
Winner:
Gar Anthony Haywood, "And Pray Nobody Sees You", from Spooks, Spies, and Private Eyes

Shortlist:
K.K. Beck, "Rule of Law", from Malice Domestic 4
Jean B. Cooper, "The Judge's Boy", from Ellery Queen's Mystery Magazine August 1995
Bill Crider, "How I Found a Cat, Lost True Love, and Broke the Bank at Monte Carlo", from Cat Crimes Takes a Vacation
Elizabeth Daniels Squire, "The Dog Who Remembered Too Much", from Malice Domestic 4

Critical / Non-fiction award
Winner:
Kate Stine, The Armchair Detective Book of Lists

Shortlist:
Nicholas A. Basbanes, A Gentle Madness: Bibliophiles, Bibliomanes, and the Eternal Passion for Books
Douglas G. Greene, John Dickson Carr: The Man Who Explained Miracles
Robert Polito, Savage Art: A Biography of Jim Thompson
B.J. Rahn, Ngaio Marsh: The Woman and Her Work

True crime award
Winner:
Ann Rule, Dead By Sunset

Shortlist:
Burl Barer, Man Overboard: The Counterfeit Resurrection of Phil Champagne
John E. Douglas & Mark Olshaker, Mindhunter: Inside the FBI's Elite Serial Crime Unit
Pete Earley, Circumstantial Evidence: Death, Life, and Justice in a Southern Town
T. J. English, Born to Kill

Short story collection / anthology award
Winner:
Marcia Muller, The McCone Files: The Complete Sharon McCone Stories

Shortlist:
Martin H. Greenberg & Edward Gorman, Cat Crimes Takes A Vacation
Carolyn G. Hart, Crimes Of The Heart
Carolyn G. Hart, Malice Domestic 4
Paula L. Woods, Spooks, Spies, and Private Eyes

Movie award
Winner:
The Usual Suspects

Shortlist:
Copycat
Devil in a Blue Dress
Get Shorty
Seven

Television series award
Winner:
The X-Files

Shortlist:
Life on the Street
Law & Order
Murder One
N.Y.P.D. Blue

Magazine award
Winner:
The Armchair Detective

Shortlist:
Deadly Pleasures
Drood Review
Ellery Queen's Mystery Magazine
Mystery Scene

Publisher award
Winner:
St. Martin's Press

Shortlist:
Avon
Mysterious Press
Scribner's
Walker Books

Editor award
Winner:
Sara Ann Freed

Shortlist:
Marjorie Braman
Carolyn Marino
Kate Miciak
Michael Seidman

Cover art award
Winner:
Pamela Patrick; for Jeanne Dams, The Body in the Transept

Shortlist:
Fred George & Corsillo/Manzone; for John Dunning, The Bookman's Wake
John Howard & Krystyna Skalski; for Bill Moody, Death of a Tenor Man
FCL Colorspace & Richard Hasselberger; for Lynn Hightower, Flashpoint
Earl Emerson; for his The Vanishing Smile

References

Anthony Awards
27
1996 in Minnesota